The 2022 Milton Keynes Council election took place on 5 May 2022 to elect members of Milton Keynes Council. This was on the same day as other local elections.

One third of the council was up for election.

Results summary

Ward results

Bletchley East

Bletchley Park

Bletchley West

Bradwell

Broughton

Campbell Park & Old Woughton

Central Milton Keynes

Danesborough & Walton

Loughton & Shenley

Monkston

Newport Pagnell North & Hanslope

Newport Pagnell South

Olney

Shenley Brook End

Stantonbury

Stony Stratford

Tattenhoe

Wolverton

Woughton & Fishermead

References

Milton K
Milton Keynes Council elections
2020s in Buckinghamshire